List of current members of the Privy Council may refer to:

List of current members of the British Privy Council
List of current members of the King's Privy Council for Canada